The Wheel of Time is the seventh studio album by German singer Sandra, released in 2002 by Virgin Records.

Overview
The Wheel of Time was produced by Michael Cretu and Jens Gad, and was Sandra's first album with new material in seven years. In addition to new compositions, it included covers of the 1980s songs "Such a Shame" originally performed by Talk Talk, "Silent Running (On Dangerous Ground)" by Mike and the Mechanics, and "Motivation" by the German duo Inker & Hamilton, as well as a cover of Depeche Mode's "Freelove". The cover photos were taken by Jim Rakete and picture Sandra without her signature long hair, sporting a short haircut.

The album was preceded by the single "Forever", released in the autumn of 2001, which was a moderate success in Germany. In 2002, "Such a Shame" and "I Close My Eyes" were released as singles, but performed poorly on the German singles chart. "Forgive Me" was distributed to radio stations as a promotional single only in Germany in June 2002, but its regular single release was eventually cancelled.

The Wheel of Time entered the German albums chart at no. 8 and also reached the top 40 on the pan-European albums sales chart.

Track listing
"Forgive Me" (Michael Cretu) — 4:25
"Footprints" (Dawn Schoenherz, Wolfgang Filz) — 3:44
"Motivation" (Dave Inker) — 4:03
"I Close My Eyes" (Andy Jonas, Michael Cretu) — 4:07
"Perfect Touch" (Heidemarie Jedner, Peter Ries, Wolfgang Filz) — 3:45
"Silent Running" (Mike Rutherford, BA Robertson) — 4:18
"Such a Shame" (Mark Hollis) — 4:21
"Now!" (Michael Cretu, Jens Gad) — 4:02
"Free Love" (Martin Gore) — 4:16
"Forever" (Peter Ries, Wolfgang Filz) — 3:46
"The Wheel of Time" (Michael Cretu, Jens Gad) — 4:08

Charts

References

External links
 The official Sandra website
 The official Sandra YouTube channel
 The Wheel of Time on Discogs

2002 albums
Albums produced by Michael Cretu
Sandra (singer) albums
Virgin Records albums